Hunger marketing is a marketing strategy specially focusing on the emotions of human beings. Hunger marketing is a psychological strategy that focuses on the desire of consumers, making them hungry thus having strong desire to buy products which other people also want to buy. By stimulating psychology, it drives people into emotional rather than rational decision making by means of driving up the scarcity of the product. This marketing strategy boosts people’s interest, and through word-of-mouth helps businesses have more potential customers. Research suggests that the scarcity of product attracts consumer attention, increases the perceived value of the product, and encourages creative usage of the product.

Related concepts

Rational decision making 
Rational decision making means what people do when they are not lacking what they need while making decisions. They are fully informed and can research their choices. Usually, people try to get and buy the best items with good prices, and for this, they think, judge, and calculate the benefits, price, and many things that are important for the deals. At this point, if people do rational decision making, people can have the best deals with good price.

Emotional decision making 
In contrast to rational decision making, emotional decision making is what people do without caution, but with feeling or emotion, much like intuitive decision making. Because people get attracted by many stimuli, they make decisions without being careful. Also, it means that they are lacking of information of alternatives, time to search or calculate, and reasonable thinking. This is exactly what many businesses try to make people, spending more money without rationality.

Techniques 
Three representative techniques of hunger marketing are described below; Limited stock, time limit and special discounts.

Limited stock 
Limited stock is the most representative technique of hunger marketing. It is also one of the strongest causes, which affects consumers directly and most powerfully. Many companies have not supplied their items adequately. Because it is hard for consumers to get and buy the product, they think that the item is really good and popular. As a result of this strategy, companies could get higher reputation of their items. Xiaomi has a strong strategy to supply their items inadequately so that they can do good inventory management and control the costs of shipping. Also, they can get increased demand. By restricting their supply, companies could make a kind of rumor that the item they sell is really good and add higher value to their product and even the price of their product, because the fact people wait in long lines or a product sold out in a couple of minutes makes people have illusion that the item seems really amazing.

Time limit 
Time limit is the most common technique of hunger marketing. Time limit also has huge impact on consumption because It is one of the direct stimuli to consumers. It is used in many home shopping and internet shopping sites. QVC, one of the biggest home shopping website, has a banner on their first page and it says “Ends in time”, which is limited with a comment, and ‘Today’s special value’ in order to attract consumers’ attention. Also, “almost sold out!” or “we are about to terminate selling! In a minute!” is a comment often used in home shopping sites or flight and hotel sites, and it stimulates customers’ interests. “The time limit for this product,” or “Only 10 items left” is the case that companies try to attract people’s attention as well. This time limitation strategy is often used with special discounts strategies such as “Only today, up to 50%.” In fact, by limiting the time of offering their products, they make consumers have feeling like “I am allowed to buy this product only this time!”

Special discounts 
Special discounts is the strongest technique of hunger marketing. Special discounts also have huge impact people’s consumption. People have experienced like “Oh, I should buy this because it is really cheap!”, even though the thing is something that people didn’t plan to buy. It is usually happening at an outlet where people suddenly stop or a TK Maxx. While web surfing, sometimes, people buy a flight and hotel ticket unexpectedly because they are attracted by special discounts. It is because consumers are really sensitive to price and many marketing strategies try to touch this sensitive point. There is a lot of research about people’s reaction to the special discounts, and, in order to influence consumers’ emotion, many companies try to emphasize their discounted price. People have very emotional reaction and they are easily impressed by discounts price. An experiment showed that people who get a big discount are happier than some people who could get only change after the experiment.

Examples

Xiaomi and Apple 
Xiaomi, the third biggest smartphone company in the world, has been known for their hunger marketing, and Apple also uses this strategy as well. “Sold out in just 50 seconds!” This comment is what an article said when Xiaomi released their latest smart phone, Mi Note 2, and it made more people focus on their new product. When Xiaomi releases their new items, they make the shortest time record every time they sell the new item. Their new item was only available on their official website to buy, and people who pre-registered could get a chance to buy that. Only for them, Xiaomi sold their product. This is how Xiaomi controls their supply. Apple also adjusts their supply to release their new product at different intervals. Because of this, they could get people’s reaction from all over the world after they release their product in a country for the first time. People who get the new product leave some comments online and people from all of the world can see their reviews. It makes them more curious about the new item.

Black Friday 
Black Friday is one of the times that people feel they need to buy some stuff because, in this season, many stores offer huge discounts. Creating the mood of shopping that people spend a lot of money is coming from making a sense of urgency that many businesses use. Many companies emphasize Thanksgiving with the big discounts they offer and try to make mood of consumption, and only at this time, many stores add more services like giveaways, free wrapping or even free shipping services. As a result of this evidence, people react to the stimuli and hoard by spending their money unexpectedly.

References

Marketing strategy